A primary school (in Ireland, the United Kingdom, Australia, Trinidad and Tobago, Jamaica, and South Africa), elementary school or grade school (in North America and the Philippines) is a school for primary education of children who are four to eleven years of age. Primary schooling follows pre-school and precedes secondary schooling.

The International Standard Classification of Education considers primary education as a single phase where programmes are typically designed to provide fundamental skills in reading, writing, and mathematics and to establish a solid foundation for learning. This is ISCED Level 1: Primary education or first stage of basic education.

Levels of education

Comparison of cohorts
Within the English speaking world, there are three widely used systems to describe the age of the child. The first is the "equivalent ages", then countries that base their education systems on the "English model" use one of two methods to identify the year group, while countries that base their systems on the "American K–12 model" refer to their year groups as "grades". Canada also follows the American model, although its names for year groups are put as a number after the grade: For instance, "Grade 1" in Canada, rather than "First Grade" in the United States. This terminology extends into the research literature.

In Canada, education is a Provincial, not a Federal responsibility. For example, the province of Ontario also had a "Grade 13," designed to help students enter the workforce or post-secondary education, but this was phased out in the year 2003.

Primary schools

In most parts of the world, primary education is the first stage of compulsory education, and is normally available without charge, but may also be offered by fee-paying independent schools. The term grade school is sometimes used in the US, although both this term and elementary school may refer to the first eight grades, in other words both primary education and lower secondary education.

The term primary school is derived from the French école primaire, which was first used in an English text in 1802. In the United Kingdom, "elementary education" was taught in "elementary schools" until 1944, when free elementary education was proposed for students over 11: there were to be primary elementary schools and secondary elementary schools; these became known as primary schools and secondary schools.

 Primary school is the preferred term in the United Kingdom, Ireland and many Commonwealth nations, and in most publications of the United Nations Educational, Scientific, and Cultural Organization (UNESCO).
 Elementary school is still preferred in some countries, especially in the United States and Canada.

In some parts of the United States, "primary school" refers to a school covering kindergarten through to second grade or third grade (K through 2 or 3); the "elementary school" includes grade three through five or grades four to six. In Canada, "elementary school" almost everywhere refers to Grades 1 through 6; with Kindergarten being referred to as "preschool."

  In South Africa, primary school starts from Grade R (age 5-6) till Grade 7 (age 12-13). It typically comes after preschool and before secondary school.

Elementary schools

Though often used as a synonym, "elementary school" has specific meanings in different locations.

 Elementary schools also known as Board Schools were first established in England and Wales in 1870 by the Forster Act (Elementary Education Act 1870). Most of these schools became primary schools in the late 1940s, following the historic compromise in the 1944 Education Act.
 Elementary school (United States): were first promoted in 1647 in the Massachusetts Bay Colony. Today, there are currently approximately 92,858 elementary schools (68,173 public, 24,685 private). In the United States, elementary schools usually have six grades with pupils aged between 5 and 11 years old. The Elementary and Secondary Education Act of 1965 was designed to fund primary and secondary education. It also emphasized equal access to education and established high standards and accountability.
 Elementary schools in Japan were first established by 1875. In Japan, the age of pupils in elementary school ranges from 6 to 12, after which the pupils enter junior high school.

Theoretical framework of primary school design
School building design does not happen in isolation. The building (or school campus) needs to accommodate:

 Curriculum content
 Teaching methods
 Costs
 Education within the political framework
 Use of school building (also in the community setting)
 Constraints imposed by the site
 Design philosophy
Each country will have a different education system and priorities. Schools need to accommodate students, staff, storage, mechanical and electrical systems, storage, support staff, ancillary staff and administration. The number of rooms required can be determined from the predicted roll of the school and the area needed.

According to standards used in the United Kingdom, a general classroom for 30 reception class or infant (Keystage 1) students needs to be 62 m2, or 55 m2 for juniors (Keystage 2). Examples are given on how this can be configured for a 210 place primary with attached 26 place nursery and two-storey 420 place (two form entry) primary school with attached 26 place nursery.

Building design specifications 

The building providing the education has to fulfill the needs of: The students, the teachers, the non-teaching support staff, the administrators and the community. It has to meet general government building guidelines, health requirements, minimal functional requirements for classrooms, toilets and showers, electricity and services, preparation and storage of textbooks and basic teaching aids. An optimum school will meet the minimum conditions and will have:

 adequately sized classrooms—where 60 m2 in considered optimum but 80 m2 for the reception class
 specialised teaching spaces
 a staff preparation room
 staff welfare facilities
 an administration block
 multipurpose classrooms
 student toilet facilities
 a general purpose school hall
 adequate equipment
 storage
 a library or library stocks that are regularly renewed
 computer rooms or media centres
 counselling, sick and medical examination rooms

Government accountants having read the advice then publish minimum guidelines on schools. These enable environmental modelling and establishing building costs. Future design plans are audited to ensure that these standards are met but not exceeded.  Government ministries continue to press for the 'minimum' space and cost standards to be reduced.

The UK government published this downwardly revised space formula for primary schools in 2014. It said the floor area should be 350 m2 + 4.1 m2/pupil place. The external finishes were to be downgraded to meet a build cost of £1113/m2.

Governance and funding
There are three main ways of funding a school: it can funded by the state through general taxation, it can be funded by a pressure group such as the mosque or the church, it can be funded by a charity or it can be funded by contributions from the parents or a combination of these methods. Day to day oversight of the school can through a board of governors, the pressure group, or the owner.

The United Kingdom allowed elementary education to be delivered in church schools, whereas in France this was illegal as there is strict separation of church and state.

Accountability
This can be through informal assessment by the staff and governors such as in Finland, or by a state run testing regime such as Ofsted in the United Kingdom.

See also

 Dame school
 Early childhood education
 Educational stage
 Virtual reality in primary education
 Vocal school (Blab school)

Notes

References

External links
 National Center for Education Statistics (NCES) (United States)
 Elementary Schools with Education and Crime Statistics (United States)
 Australian CensusAtSchool (Australia) 
 Canadian Education Statistics Council (CESC) (United States)
 Office for National Statistics (ONS) (United Kingdom)
 BB103_Area_Guidelines_for_Mainstream_Schools (2014) UK 
 National Center for Education Statistics (NCES) (United States)
 OECD Standardised designs (2011)

 
Educational stages
School
School terminology
School types